KPJO-LD (channel 49) is a low-power television station licensed to Pittsburg, Kansas, United States, serving the Joplin, Missouri–Pittsburg, Kansas market as an affiliate of the digital multicast network Court TV. The station is owned by Innovate Corp. and licensed to its DTV America subsidiary. KPJO-LD's transmitter is located near the corner of NE Bethlehem Road and NE 80th Street in a rural section of Cherokee County, Kansas, near Galena.

History
The station began existence as K49GR, but it was not on the air. It was granted a construction permit in 2002, and the call letters KPJO-LP came in 2005. It is unknown what affiliations KPJO had between then and 2014.

In 2014, DTV America Corporation and Pittsburg/Joplin TV, LLC signed a local marketing agreement to bring a MyNetworkTV and Antenna TV affiliate to Joplin, Missouri, and Pittsburg, Kansas.

MyNetworkTV was previously the only major channel (network or programming service) that wasn't available directly from Joplin. KMYT-TV in Tulsa, Oklahoma, was the de facto MyNetworkTV affiliate in the western half of the Joplin market, while the eastern part of the market relied on Fox affiliate KRBK in nearby Springfield, Missouri, and before that, KWBM in Harrison, Arkansas, from 2006 to 2009 and KSFX-TV (now KOZL-TV) from 2009 to 2011 for MyNetworkTV programming, but MyNetworkTV programming on KRBK was run out of pattern since 2011 when Fox programming moved to that station. The CW, on the other hand, was only accessible via cable television through cable-exclusive CW Plus affiliate "KSXF", one of the many cable-only CW Plus and original WB 100+ affiliates with faux call letters. In August 2018, KFJX launched CW+ on digital channel 14.2, although some cable companies choose to stay with the same programming as "KSXF" (via a non-local nationwide feed of the network) and it is currently not carried on satellite.

In Spring 2015, the station's original licensee, Pittsburgh/Joplin TV, LLC, has sold the station outright to DTV America, thereby making DTV America the sole license holder of the station. In addition, KPJO-LP launched a third digital subchannel to carry the Sonlife Broadcasting Network. In early 2016, KPJO-LD4 was launched to carry FremantleMedia-owned Buzzr, featuring classic game shows. At the same time, KPJO-LD5 launched with Bounce TV programming. However, in June 2016, Bounce TV was replaced with The Country Network due to local rights to Bounce TV went to KODE-DT3. In the same month, the Liquidation Channel and QVC2 became respectively available on KPJO's sixth and seventh digital subchannels.

In October 2017, KPJO-LP was one of a handful of stations to be sold to HC2 Holdings, but remain operated by DTV America. Two months later, the station began simulcasting the MyNetworkTV schedule as aired on the second subchannel of Rehoboth Beach, Delaware NBC affiliate WRDE-LD. In spring 2019, the MyNetworkTV schedule was simulcast from KWWE-LD of Lake Charles, Louisiana.

On June 3, 2019, KPJO-LP's Antenna TV affiliation was dropped to become affiliated with the newly resurrected Court TV network. This left the Joplin television market without an Antenna TV affiliate until February 1, 2021, when KSNF added it to its DT4 subchannel.

The station changed its call sign to KPJO-LD on August 8, 2019.

Programming

KPJO-LD's programming schedule is actually similar to that of sister station WCZU-LD in Bowling Green, Kentucky. MyNetworkTV programming is run on weeknights from 7 to 9 p.m. CT, and Court TV programming is aired outside MyNetworkTV's prime time programming for 22 hours every weekday, and all 48 hours of the weekend. Court TV dominates the weekend broadcast schedule since MyNet does not run programming on Saturdays or Sundays. In August 2015, KPJO-LP's main subchannel became the Joplin-area home to Raycom Sports syndicated broadcasts of Atlantic Coast Conference football and men's basketball games, produced under the ACC Network label.

On channel 49.2, Doctor TV programming was previously available. Doctor TV is a healthy lifestyle-oriented television channel featuring healthy-cooking shows, fitness shows, lifestyle programs, and some classic movies, along with some programming from The Worship Network from 1 to 3:30 a.m. CT (2 to 4:30 a.m. ET). Doctor TV's national feed can be viewed online at their website. On Tuesday, December 8, 2015, KPJO-LD2 dropped DrTV in favor of Sony Pictures Television's classic movie network, GetTV.

Technical information

Subchannels
The station's digital signal is multiplexed:

References

External links
KPJO-LD PITTSBURG, KS @ RabbitEars.Info
DTV America

 

Antenna TV affiliates
Court TV affiliates
Buzzr affiliates
GetTV affiliates
Bounce TV affiliates
PJO-LD
Television channels and stations established in 2005
Low-power television stations in the United States
Innovate Corp.
2005 establishments in Kansas